808 Naval Air Squadron is a ship-based helicopter squadron of the Royal Australian Navy.

The squadron was originally part of the British Royal Navy's Fleet Air Arm; it was formed in July 1940 as a fleet fighter squadron. It served on a number of the Navy's aircraft carriers during the Second World War, serving in most of the theatres of the war, before decommissioning at the end of the war.

It was re-formed in 1950 as 808 Squadron RAN, a carrier-based attack squadron of the Royal Australian Navy's Fleet Air Arm, and saw action during the Korean War before disbanding again in 1958.

It was re-formed in 2011 to operate the Taipan helicopter.

History

Royal Navy
808 Squadron was formed at RNAS Worthy Down in July 1940, flying twelve Fairey Fulmars in the role of a Fleet Fighter squadron. They were initially assigned to the Isle of Man to carry out patrols over the Irish Sea, but were soon transferred to Wick for the defence of the dockyards. Following this, the squadron was reassigned to RAF Fighter Command and was one of only two Allied naval aviation squadrons to take part in the Battle of Britain, the other being 804 Naval Air Squadron.

In September 1940, the squadron was assigned to the aircraft carrier , which was part of Force H, operating in the Mediterranean. The squadron shot down two enemy aircraft in an attack on Sardinia in November, followed by another two in operations over Sicily in January 1941, and a fifth while defending Malta in May. Although all of the squadron personnel survived the sinking, many of the aircraft were lost in the attack: the surviving aircraft were flown from Ark Royal before the carrier sank and on arrival in Gibraltar were merged with the survivors of 807 Squadron, which had also been embarked.

808 Squadron was re-formed with six Fulmar IIs aboard  in January 1942. They came aboard HMS Battler between April and May 1943 and took part in operations covering the Salerno landings in September 1943. They then formed part of the 3rd Naval Fighter Wing, returning to the United Kingdom aboard HMS Hunter.

The Squadron was re-equipped in May 1944 at RNAS Lee-on-Solent with 20 Supermarine Seafire L.IIIs. At the same time, they were attached to No. 345 Reconnaissance Wing of the Royal Air Force Second Tactical Air Force. While part of this wing, 808 Squadron, along with three other FAA squadrons (885, 886 and 897) and two RAF squadrons (26 and 63), plus the USN's VCS-7, flying Spifire VBs, provided valuable target coordinates and fire control for RN and USN battleships and cruisers, during 20 days of operations during the Normandy Landings. On D-Day, "pooling" of the spotting units' aircraft meant that all units flew either Spitfires or Seafires. This role of "spotters" lasted until 26 June, by which time the fighting was too far inland to be covered by the ship's guns.

Following this, the squadron was re-equipped with 24 Hellcat Is and IIs. 808 Squadron was assigned to the British Eastern Fleet in January 1945, embarked aboard the escort carrier HMS Khedive. While part of the Eastern Fleet, the squadron operated off Malaya and Sumatra, with periods spent flying off . They covered the re-occupation of Rangoon in Operation Dracula in May, carried out attacks against Japanese airfields in Sumatra in June and covered the re-occupation of Malaya after the Surrender of Japan; the squadron was disbanded at the end of the war.

Royal Australian Navy

808 Squadron was re-formed on 25 April 1950 at RNAS St Merryn, equipped with Hawker Sea Furies and assigned to operate with the Royal Australian Navy. The squadron was embarked aboard HMAS Sydney as part of the 21st Carrier Air Group.

808 Squadron was one of three RAN squadrons embarked aboard Sydney during her deployment to the Korean War. 808 Squadron's tour of Korea primarily consisted of combat air patrols, ground attack support, armed reconnaissance, and anti-shipping strikes. In 1954, the squadron was decommissioned, but was re-formed a year later, equipped with de Havilland Sea Venom FAW.53s, and assigned to the new Australian carrier, HMAS Melbourne. 808 Squadron remained in service for three years, and was finally decommissioned on 1 December 1958.

808 Squadron re-formed in 2011 to operate the RAN's six MRH90 helicopters. The squadron was formally recommissioned on 11 July 2013.

Aircraft

Current (2010s)
MRH90

Korean War (1950s)
Hawker Sea Fury Mk II
de Havilland Sea Venom FAW.53

World War II (1940s)
Fairey Fulmar Mk I and II
Supermarine Seafire L.IIIs
F6F Hellcat Mk I and II

References

Citations

Bibliography
 Hill, Steven D. "Invasion! Fortress Europe: Naval aviation in France, summer 1944" Naval Aviation News May–June 1994.
 Price, Alfred. Spitfire a Complete  Fighting History. Enderby, Leicester, UK:The Promotional Reprint Company Limited, 1991.

External links
808 Squadron at the Fleet Air Arm archive
808 Squadron webpage at the Royal Australian Navy website

Flying squadrons of the Royal Australian Navy
Military units and formations established in 1940
800 series Fleet Air Arm squadrons
Military units and formations of Australia in the Korean War